Adelieledone is a genus of octopuses in the family Megaleledonidae.

According to the Census of Marine Life, it may be the closest living relative of the Antarctic ancestor of all octopus species that lived 30 million years ago. Their habitats include; Southern Ocean, Antarctic Ocean, and South Georgia. The most notable feature of adelieledone is the rostral point on the lower beak. It is placed in the family Megaleledonidae by some authorities and in the Octopodidae by others.

Species
There are three recognized species:

References

Matias, Ricardo S., et al. “Show Your Beaks and We Tell You What You Eat: Different Ecology in Sympatric Antarctic Benthic Octopods under a Climate Change Context.” Marine Environmental Research, vol. 150, 2019, p. 104757., doi:10.1016/j.marenvres.2019.104757. 
Schwarz, Richard, et al. “Life Histories of Antarctic Incirrate Octopods (Cephalopoda: Octopoda).” PLOS ONE, vol. 14, no. 7, 2019, doi:10.1371/journal.pone.0219694. 

Octopodidae
Cephalopod genera